Art Greenhaw (born July 14, 1954) is an American musician, record producer and audio engineer who was awarded the Grammy Award in 2003 for the Best Southern, Country or Bluegrass Gospel Album for We Called Him Mr. Gospel Music: The James Blackwood Tribute Album. Additionally, he founded the independent record label, Greenhaw Records.

Greenhaw is the bassist, multi-instrumentalist and manager for the Light Crust Doughboys, which he officially joined as a band member in 1993 under the direction of Marvin "Smokey" Montgomery, one of Greenhaw's musical mentors. The symphony performances and other enterprises of the Light Crust Doughboys in the 1990s and in the new millennium, are largely the product of Greenhaw's imagination and promotional skill.

In addition, his musicianship, production, arranging and songwriting has included work with Nokie Edwards, Tom Brumley, James Blackwood, Ann-Margret, Engelbert Humperdinck, Trini Lopez and Ronnie Dawson.

Life and career 
Greenhaw was born in Dallas, Texas. and started music at an early age. At age eight, he learned to play the guitar, and by the fourth grade had his own band, "The Doodlebugs". Greenshaw then played in a rock band named "The Inner Soul". where he met physician George Miller, the father of rock musician Steve Miller. The elder Miller hired Greenhaw's band to play at various parties. Greenhaw's interest in guitar led him to country music. At the same time, Greenhaw studied classical music as a child at the Southern Methodist University (SMU) Piano Preparatory Department from 1966 to 1970. Greenhaw received his bachelor's degree in political science from SMU in 1976.

Starting in 1983, Greenhaw served as the musical director and band leader of a weekly country music revue, the Mesquite Opry. He first worked with the Light Crust Doughboys when he booked them to play at the Mesquite Folk Festival in 1983, which Greenhaw had founded. Greenhaw became excited about the prospects for the band, which had been working only sporadically for several years. Walter Hailey, the Doughboys' master of ceremonies in the 1950s, was born in Mesquite and a friend of Greenhaw's family.

Greenhaw has been bassist and co-producer of the Light Crust Doughboys since 1993. He set into motion a plan through which the Doughboys would create for themselves a new golden age. That plan resulted in the Doughboys making frequent appearances in theaters throughout Texas and Oklahoma. Greenhaw's experience as a rock guitarist has affected his bass playing. He usually plays with a pick, a feature more common to rock bassists than to jazz, country or western swing players. Greenhaw brings great variety to the Doughboys' bass position. His approach changed the bass sound of the Doughboys' rhythm section; the bass, before always supportive, now is more melodic and noticeable, as in rock music.

Greenhaw also organized unusual performance and recording opportunities for the Doughboys. In 1997, Greenhaw took the lead in composing and arranging the music and recording the soundtrack for the documentary film Lugosi: Hollywood's Dracula , about actor Bela Lugosi. He worked on the project with University of Oklahoma instructor Gary Rhodes. The project received a rave review in Filmfax magazine. Also, during 1997, the Doughboys participated in a cooperative recording effort entitled The High Road on the Hilltop, this time joining up with the Southern Methodist University Mustang Band. This collaboration came through Greenhaw's previous connections with the SMU. Greenhaw's father, Frank, also earned a degree from SMU and from 1941 to 1945 was student director of the Southern Methodist University Mustang Band. Greenhaw wrote three of the songs recorded: "High Road", "Texas Women" and "Hangin' 'Round Deep Ellum". The 2005 album, 20th Century Gospel : From Hymns to Blackwood Brothers Tribute to Christian Country, included contributions from Greenhaw, the Light Crust Doughboys, the Jordanaires, and Nokie Edwards. AllMusic commented that it was "A pristinely recorded and expertly played slice of truly American music, 20th Century Gospel is an uplifting work that resonates with the participants' obvious love of making music."

In 2006, in conjunction with the Diamond Anniversary of the Light Crust Doughboys, ASC (America Sejung Corporation) were commissioned to produce a limited edition series of seven fretted musical instruments. In collaboration with Art Greenhaw as technical advisor, these included a banjo, mandolin (with pickup), electric bass, and both hollow and solid-body electric guitars. The models were produced in a customised "Biscuit Brown", with its burst-edge fade resembling an oven-baked biscuit in color.

Greenhaw was inducted into the Texas Gospel Music Hall of Fame in 2015 at the Dallas Baptist University, in Dallas, Texas. The same year Greenhaw's  book, Mesquite (Images of America), was released via Arcadia Publishing.

In 2016, Greenhaw began creating, editing and writing faith-based visual novels and comic books, starting with book series title God's Silver Soldiers, also known as Silver Soldiers: The Comic and followed by Tales of Nazareth: The Boyhood of Jesus. The comic books, under the imprint of Truthmonger Comics Group Publishing, have achieved acclaim for their action-oriented innovation in illustration by comic book artist Ben Dunn as well as their storylines, and they have been covered in the media by TV channels, newspapers, and faith-based, nationally syndicated radio.

Discography

Grammy Award listing

Other awards 
1980: Recipient of commendation, President Jimmy Carter
1995: Named Official State of Texas Music Ambassador, Texas House of Representatives
1995: Recipient of Family Business of Year Award, Baylor University, Waco, Texas
1995: Commendation from Texas Commission on the Arts, Austin
1999: Dove Award nominee
2002: Dove Award nominee

Publications 
The Ultimate All-Day Singing Songook Book, Marvin Montgomery & Art Greenhaw, 1999, Mel Bay Publications, Incorporated, CD / Hardback book, 
The Light Crust Doughboys Songbook, Marvin "Smokey" Montgomery & Art Greenhaw, 2001, Mel Bay Publications, Incorporated, CD / Hardback book,

References

Bibliography 
   pp. 108, 111, 113, 114, 115, 119, 121.

External links 
Official website
A Life In Gospel Music – Art Greenhaw Records (video)
Stan Lee and Grammy-Winning Christian Comics Creator Art Greenhaw (video)
Trini Lopez – Legacy: My Texas Roots story with Art Greenhaw (video)

1954 births
Living people
American male bass guitarists
American bass guitarists
American music arrangers
Record producers from Texas
American male singer-songwriters
American performers of Christian music
American audio engineers
Singer-songwriters from Texas
Guitarists from Texas
Grammy Award winners
Musicians from Dallas
Composers of Christian music
Comic book editors
Comic book company founders